Academic freedom is a moral and legal concept expressing the conviction that the freedom of inquiry by faculty members is essential to the mission of the academy as well as the principles of academia, and that scholars should have freedom to teach or communicate ideas or facts (including those that are inconvenient to external political groups or to authorities) without fear of repression, job loss, or imprisonment. While the core of academic freedom covers scholars acting in an academic capacity — as teachers or researchers expressing strictly scholarly viewpoints —, an expansive interpretation extends these occupational safeguards to scholars' speech on matters outside their professional expertise. Especially within the anglo-saxon discussion it is most commonly defined as a type of freedom of speech, while the current scientific discourse in the Americas and Continental Europe more often define it as a human right with freedom of speech just being one aspect among many within the concept of academic freedom.

Academic freedom is a contested issue and, therefore, has limitations in practice. In the United States, for example, according to the widely recognized "1940 Statement on Academic Freedom and Tenure" of the American Association of University Professors, teachers should be careful to avoid controversial matters that are unrelated to the subject discussed. When they speak or write in public, they are free to express their opinions without fear from institutional censorship or discipline, but they should show restraint and clearly indicate that they are not speaking for their institution. Academic tenure protects academic freedom by ensuring that teachers can be fired only for causes such as gross professional incompetence or behavior that evokes condemnation from the academic community itself.

Historical background
 
Although the notion of academic freedom has a long implicit history (Leiden University, founded in 1575, birthplace of the modern concept), the development of this idea cannot be separated from Wilhelm von Humboldt. Humboldt was a philosopher and linguist who was given the authority to create a new university in Berlin in the early 19th century. He then founded a university that adhered to two principles of academic freedom: freedom of scientific inquiry and the unity between research and teaching. According to Humboldt, the fundamental proposition underlying the principles of academic freedom was to uphold the view that science is not something that has already been found but as knowledge that will never be fully discovered and, yet, needs to be searched for unceasingly. The university he founded later became a model and inspiration for modern colleges in Germany and universities in the West.

The concept of academic freedom was also clearly formulated in response to the encroachments of the totalitarian state on science and academia in general for the furtherance of its own goals. For instance, in the Soviet Union, scientific research was brought under strict political control in the 1930s. A number of research areas were declared "bourgeois pseudoscience" and forbidden, notably genetics (see "Lysenkoism") and sociology. The trend toward subjugating science to the interests of the state also had proponents in the West, including the influential Marxist John Desmond Bernal, who published The Social Function of Science in 1939.

In contrast to this approach, Michael Polanyi argued that a structure of liberty is essential for the advancement of science – that the freedom to pursue science for its own sake is a prerequisite for the production of knowledge through peer review and the scientific method.

In 1936, as a consequence of an invitation to give lectures for the Ministry of Heavy Industry in the USSR, Polanyi met Bukharin, who told him that in socialist societies all scientific research is directed to accord with the needs of the latest five-year plan. Demands in Britain for centrally planned scientific research led Polanyi, together with John Baker, to found the influential Society for Freedom in Science. The society promoted a liberal conception of science as free enquiry against the instrumental view that science should exist primarily to serve the needs of society.

In a series of articles, re-published in The Contempt of Freedom (1940) and The Logic of Liberty (1951), Polanyi claimed that co-operation amongst scientists is analogous to the way in which agents co-ordinate themselves within a free market. Just as consumers in a free market determine the value of products, science is a spontaneous order that arises as a consequence of open debate amongst specialists. Science can therefore only flourish when scientists have the liberty to pursue truth as an end in itself:

Rationale
Proponents of academic freedom believe that the freedom of inquiry by students and faculty members is essential to the mission of the academy. They argue that academic communities are repeatedly targeted for repression due to their ability to shape and control the flow of information. When scholars attempt to teach or communicate ideas or facts that are inconvenient to external political groups or to authorities, they may find themselves targeted for public vilification, job loss, imprisonment, or even death. For example, in North Africa, a professor of public health discovered that his country's infant mortality rate was higher than government figures indicated. He lost his job and was imprisoned.

The fate of biology in the Soviet Union is also cited as a reason why society has an interest in protecting academic freedom. A Soviet biologist Trofim Lysenko rejected Western science – then focused primarily on making advances in theoretical genetics, based on research with the fruit fly (Drosophila melanogaster) – and proposed a more socially relevant approach to farming that was based on the collectivist principles of dialectical materialism. (Lysenko called this "Michurinism", but it is more popularly known today as Lysenkoism.) Lysenko's ideas proved appealing to the Soviet leadership, in part because of their value as propaganda, and he was ultimately made director of the Soviet Academy of Agricultural Sciences. Subsequently, Lysenko directed a purge of scientists who professed "harmful ideas", resulting in the expulsion, imprisonment, or death of hundreds of Soviet scientists. Lysenko's ideas were then implemented on collectivised farms in the Soviet Union and China. Famines that resulted partly from Lysenko's influence are believed to have killed 30 million people in China alone.

AFAF (Academics For Academic Freedom) of the United Kingdom is a campaign for lecturers, academic staff and researchers who want to make a public statement in favour of free enquiry and free expression. Their statement of Academic Freedom has two main principles:

 that academics, both inside and outside the classroom, have unrestricted liberty to question and test received wisdom and to put forward controversial and unpopular opinions, whether or not these are deemed offensive, and
 that academic institutions have no right to curb the exercise of this freedom by members of their staff, or to use it as grounds for disciplinary action or dismissal.

AFAF and those who agree with its principles believe that it is important for academics to be able not only to express their opinions, but also to put them to scrutiny and to open further debate. They are against the idea of telling the public Platonic "noble lies" and believe that people need not be protected from radical views.

Sociologist Ruth Pearce argued that the concept of academic freedom exists to protect scholarship from censure by state or religious authorities, and not to defend intolerance.

For academic staff
The concept of academic freedom as a right of faculty members is an established part of most legal systems. While in the United States the constitutional protection of academic freedom derives from the guarantee of free speech under the First Amendment, the constitutions of other countries (particularly in civil law systems) typically grant a separate right to free learning, teaching, and research.

Canada 

During the interwar years (cir. 1919–1939) Canadian academics were informally expected to be apolitical, lest they bring trouble to their respective universities which, at the time, were very much dependent upon provincial government grants. As well, many Canadian academics of the time considered their position to be remote from the world of politics and felt they had no place getting involved in political issues. However, with the increase of socialist activity in Canada during the Great Depression, due to the rise of social gospel ideology, some left-wing academics began taking active part in contemporary political issues outside the university. Thus, individuals such as Frank H. Underhill at the University of Toronto and other members or affiliates with the League for Social Reconstruction or the socialist movement in Canada who held academic positions, began to find themselves in precarious positions with their university employers. Frank H. Underhill, for example, faced criticism from within and without academia and near expulsion from his university position for his public political comments and his involvement with the League for Social Reconstruction and the Co-Operative Commonwealth Federation. According to Michiel Horn this era marked,

In 2020, the University of Ottawa suspended one of its teachers for using the n-word in a metalinguistic way, which sparked a controversy over academic freedom.

China 

Academic freedom is severely limited in China. Academics have noted an incentive not to express 'incorrect' opinions about issues sensitive to the Government of China and the ruling Chinese Communist Party (CCP). These efforts have been effective in causing academics to self-censor and shift academic discourse.

In December 2020, the Associated Press reported that China was controlling scientific research into the origins of COVID-19 under direct orders from CCP general secretary Xi Jinping. According to the report, an order by China's State Council required all research to be approved by a task force under their management, saying scientific publication should be orchestrated like "a game of chess", warning that those who publish without permission will be held accountable.

France
Professors at public French universities and researchers in public research laboratories are expected, as are all civil servants, to behave in a neutral manner and to not favor any particular political or religious point of view during the course of their duties. However, the academic freedom of university professors is a fundamental principle recognized by the laws of the Republic, as defined by the Constitutional Council; furthermore, statute law declares about higher education that "teachers-researchers (university professors and assistant professors), researchers and teachers are fully independent and enjoy full freedom of speech in the course of their research and teaching activities, provided they respect, following university traditions and the dispositions of this code, principles of tolerance and objectivity". The nomination and promotion of professors is largely done through a process of peer review rather than through normal administrative procedures.

Germany
The German Constitution specifically grants academic freedom: "Art and science, research and teaching are free. Freedom of teaching does not absolve from loyalty to the constitution" (Art. 5, para. 3). In a tradition reaching back to the 19th century, jurisdiction has understood this right as one to teach, study, and conduct research freely, although the last concept has sometimes been taken as a cover term for the first two.  embraces the right of professors to determine the content of their lectures and to publish the results of their research without prior approval.

Since professors through their Habilitation receive the right to teach in a particular academic field, academic freedom is deemed to cover at least the entirety of this field.  means a student's right to determine an individual course of study. Finally,  permits academic self-governance and grants the university control of its internal affairs.

Ireland 
Protections for academic freedom are provided in Section 14 of the 1997 Universities Act. It provides academics with protection for research, teaching and other activity "to question and test received wisdom, to put forward new ideas and to state controversial or unpopular opinions" without being disadvantaged.

Mauritius 
In Mauritius the academic staff have the following rights, which are stated in the Chapter II Constitution of Mauritius: the protection of Freedom of Conscience, Protection of Freedom of Expression, Protection of Freedom of Assembly and Association, Protection of Freedom to Establish schools and the Protection from Discrimination. In a 2012 paper on the University of Mauritius the author states that although there are no records of abuse of human rights or freedom of the state "subtle threats to freedom of expression do exist, especially with regard to criticisms of ruling political parties and their leaders as well as religious groups." The government of Mauritius endorses the practice of academic freedom in the tertiary institutions of the country. Academic freedom became a public issue in May 2009 when the University of Mauritius spoke out against the previous vice chancellor Professor I. Fagoonee, who had forwarded a circular sent by the Ministry of Education to academics. This circular targeted public officers and required them to consult their superiors before speaking to the press. According to the paper, academics were annoyed by the fact that the vice chancellor had endorsed the circular by sending it to them when it was addressed to public officers. In an interview the vice- chancellor stated that while academics were free to speak to the press they should not compromise university policy or government policy. An academic spoke to the prime minister and the issue was eventually taken up to parliament. The vice chancellor was then required to step down. In return the government publicly endorsed the practice of academic freedom.

The institutional bureaucracy and the dependence on the state for funds has restricted the freedom of academics to criticize government policy. An interview with Dr. Kasenally an educator at the University of Mauritius expresses her views on academic freedom in the university. The professor states that in 1970s to 1980s the university was at the forefront of debates. But in the 1990s the university stepped away from controversial debates. In 1986, the rights of academics to engage in politics was removed to curtail academic freedom. Academics at the University of Mauritius have thus been encouraged to not express their views or ideas especially if the views oppose those of the management or government. While there have been no cases of arrests or extreme detention of academics, there is a fear that it would hinder their career progress especially at the level of a promotion thus, the academics try to avoid participating in controversial debates.

Netherlands
In the Netherlands the academic freedom is limited. In November 1985 the Dutch Ministry of Education published a policy paper titled Higher Education: Autonomy and Quality. This paper had a proposal that steered away from traditional education and informed that the future of higher education sector should not be regulated by the central government. In 1992 the Law of Higher Education and Research (Wet op het hoger onderwijs en wetenschappelijk onderzoek, article 1.6) was published and became effective in 1993. However, this law governs only certain institutions. Furthermore, the above provision is part of an ordinary statute and lacks constitutional status, so it can be changed anytime by a simple majority in Parliament.

New Zealand
Academic freedom pertains to forms of expression by academic staff engaged in scholarship and is defined by the Education Act 1989 (s161(2)) as:
a) The freedom of academic staff and students, within the law, to question and test received wisdom, to put forward new ideas and to state controversial or unpopular opinions; 
b) The freedom of academic staff and students to engage in research; 
c) The freedom of the university and its staff to regulate the subject matter of courses taught at the university; 
d) The freedom of the university and its staff to teach and assess students in the manner they consider best promotes learning; and 
e) The freedom of the university through its council and vice-chancellor to appoint its own staff.

Philippines
The 1987 Philippine Constitution states that, "Academic Freedom shall be enjoyed in all institutions of higher learning." Philippine jurisprudence and courts of law, including the Philippine Supreme Court tend to reflexively defer to the institutional autonomy of higher institutions of learning in determining academic decisions with respect to the outcomes of individual cases filed in the courts regarding the abuse of Academic Freedom by professors, despite the individual merits or demerits of any cases. A closely watched case was the controversial case of University of the Philippines at Diliman Sociology Professor Sarah Raymundo who was not granted tenure due to an appeal by the minority dissenting vote within the faculty of the Sociology Department. This decision was sustained upon appeal by the dissenting faculty and Professor Raymundo to the University of the Philippines at Diliman Chancellor Sergio S. Cao; and though the case was elevated to University of the Philippines System President Emerlinda R. Roman, Roman denied the appeal which was elevated by Professor Raymundo to the university's board of regents for decision and the BOR granted her request for tenure. A major bone of contention among the supporters of Professor Raymundo was not to question the institutional Academic Freedom of the department in not granting her tenure, but in asking for transparency in how the Academic Freedom of the department was exercised, in keeping with traditions within the University of the Philippines in providing a basis that may be subject to peer review, for Academic decisions made under the mantle of Academic Freedom.

South Africa
The South African Constitution of 1996 offers protection of academic freedom and the freedom of scholarly research. Academic freedom became a main principle for higher education by 1997. Three main threats are believed to jeopardize academic freedom: government regulations, excessive influence of private sector sponsor on a university, and limitations of freedom of speech in universities.

There have been an abundance of scandals over the restricted academic freedom at a number of universities in South Africa. The University of KwaZulu-Natal received fame over its restricted academic freedom and the scandal that occurred in 2007. In this scandal a sociology lecturer, Fazel Khan was fired in April 2007 for "bringing the university into disrepute" after he released information to the news media. According to Khan he had been airbrushed from a photograph in a campus publication because of his participation in a staff strike last February. In light of this scandal the South African Council on Higher Education released a report stating that the state is influencing academic freedom. In particular, public universities are more susceptible to political pressure because they receive funds from the public.

United Kingdom
The Robbins Report on Higher Education, commissioned by the British government and published in 1963, devoted a full chapter, Chapter XVI, to Academic freedom and its scope. This gives a detailed discussion of the importance attached both to freedom of individual academics and of the institution itself. In a world, both then and now, where illiberal governments are all too ready to attack freedom of expression, the Robbins committee saw the (then) statutory protection given to academic freedom as giving some protection for society as a whole from any temptation to mount such attacks.

When Margaret Thatcher's government sought to remove many of the statutory protections of academic freedom which Robbins had regarded as so important, she was partly frustrated by a hostile amendment to her bill in the House of Lords. This incorporated into what became the 1988 Education Reform Act, the legal right of academics in the UK 'to question and test received wisdom and to put forward new ideas and controversial or unpopular opinions without placing themselves in jeopardy of losing their jobs or the privileges they may have'. These principles of academic freedom are thus articulated in the statutes of most UK universities. Professor Kathleen Stock formerly of University of Sussex resigned from her role due to controversy from students and the media regarding her transphobic views. In response to such concerns, the Equality and Human Rights Commission has issued guidance. The Guidance provides detailed procedures for universities to consider in determining whether or not specific events can go ahead. It also provides ways to reduce any potential barriers for freedom of speech in regards to specific events. The guidance also makes clear the statutory requirement of universities to ensure they protect freedom of speech on campus however as well as compliance with the Prevent Strategy and the Equality Act 2010. In 2016 the Warden of Wadham College Oxford, a lawyer previously Director of Public Prosecutions, pointed out that the Conservative government's anti-terrorism "Prevent" strategy legislation has placed on universities 'a specific enforceable duty ... to prevent the expression of views that are otherwise entirely compatible with the criminal law'.

United States
In the United States, academic freedom is generally taken as the notion of academic freedom defined by the "1940 Statement of Principles on Academic Freedom and Tenure", jointly authored by the American Association of University Professors (AAUP) and the Association of American Colleges (AAC, now the Association of American Colleges and Universities). These principles state that "Teachers are entitled to freedom in the classroom in discussing their subject." The statement also permits institutions to impose "limitations of academic freedom because of religious or other aims", so long as they are "clearly stated in writing at the time of the appointment". The Principles have only the character of private pronouncements, not that of binding law.

Seven regional accreditors work with American colleges and universities, including private and religious institutions, to implement this standard. Additionally, the AAUP, which is not an accrediting body, works with these same institutions. The AAUP does not always agree with the regional accrediting bodies on the standards of protection of academic freedom and tenure. The AAUP lists (censures) those colleges and universities which it has found, after its own investigations, to violate these principles.By 2022, 88 percent of four-year colleges and universities will limit student free speech, reversing a 15-year trend, according to the College Speech Codes annual report.The Foundation for Individual Rights and Expression (FIRE) reported that 426 out of 486 institutions have at least one policy restricting student speech.

Israel 
Academic freedom in Israel is taken from "the Law of the Council for Higher Education". Paragraph 15 in which it states that "a recognized institution is free to all its academic and administrative matters, within the framework of its budget, as it sees fit. In this paragraph, 'academic and administrative matters' - includes: determining a research and teaching program, appointing the authorities of the institution, appointing teachers and promoting them, determining a teaching method and study, and any other scientific, educational or economic activity". It seems that the paragraph is worded in a clear and comprehensible way even for laymen. The body that is supposed to guard academic freedom, as well as maintain an adequate academic level in the higher education institutions, is the Council for Higher Education - hereinafter "The Council". This council consists of academics who serve as professors at universities, and public figures, with the Minister of Education as the head of the council.

At the disposal of "The Council" is an executive body called the "Committee for Planning and Budgeting", which mainly deals with the matter of universities budgeting and establishing relevant procedures and guidelines for budget and salary matters. Another body that is supposed to guard academic freedom is the "Committee of the Heads of the Universities", which is a voluntary body, but has an influence on the work of the Legislature and "The Council ". Through their employee committees, and through the personal activity of each of them, these bodies can try and influence the preservation of academic freedom.

In general, it can be said that the essential academic freedom, the one aimed at the freedom of teaching and research, was preserved, and the government neither interfered nor tried to interfere in these contents. Its way of influencing this matter is by providing incentives for teaching in this or that way, or for research in certain fields, and this is through grants. The fact that the government finances a significant percentage of the current budget of the universities (around 70% or more), also allows the government to decide what will be the tuition fee for a student at the budgeted universities in Israel. But, In 2021, an academic committee of the prestigious Israel Prize decided to award the Israel Prize in the field of mathematics and computer science to Professor Oded Goldreich from the Weizmann Institute of Science. The Minister of Education did not accept the committee's recommendation on the grounds that Goldreich signed a petition calling for an academic boycott of Ariel University, which is located in the territories of Judea and Samaria, which are occupied territory, as well as for appealing to the German government to revoke its decision that the BDS movement is an anti-Semitic movement. The award committee appealed to the Supreme Court for a violation of its academic freedom, and the court overturned the decision, and ordered the Minister of Education to award Goldreich the award. Godreich received the award a year later.

In recent years, a fierce debate has erupted on the issue of academic freedom, following extreme political statements by a number of university faculty members. The vast majority of the controversial statements were those that called for an academic boycott of Israel, or support for organizations that support an economic and academic boycott of Israel. The question that was at the center of the storm was whether an academic faculty member (hereafter referred to as a professor) is protected by the principle of freedom of speech, or is it forbidden, when he wears the guise of a professor, to express a political position that might identify the position with the institution he allegedly represents. All the more, is it permissible for the professor to express a political position during his teaching, and even to invite representatives of political bodies to lecture in his classes, and without maintaining a balance between those invited. Referring to that background, the Minister of Education at the time Naftali Bennett (in 2017) asked Prof. Asa Kasher to compile an academic code of ethics for universities, a code that was approved by "The Council" in March 2018. All the research universities (7 universities), with the exception of Ben-Gurion University of the Negev, which already had for an academic code of ethics that also included the issue of freedom of expression, refused to adopt this code on the grounds of infringing academic freedom.

Academic freedom subject to Auditing 
All research universities in Israel have a Chief internal auditor, relatively independent. This issue of the interrelationship between the internal audit in universities and the principle of academic freedom is discussed in detail in an article that appeared in a book issued on behalf of the Ben-Gurion university of the Negev - the only one as mentioned that has a binding academic code of ethicss. In this matter there are some variations among the universities. The university auditor's authority to review issues under the authority of the university senate (especially academic issues and academic appointments) is limited in all universities, except for the Ben-Gurion University in the Negev. There it is written in its constitution and in the general regulations: "There is no control over the University Internal Auditor except the law, the constitution (of the university) and the general regulations", and according to the general regulations the auditor must (only) "respect the academic freedom granted to the university, including its faculty members" . The question immediately arises: who will determine which matter enjoys academic freedom and which does not. According to the article, only the Chief Internal auditor will determine this and in light of 2 rules: 1. Any issue on which the academic regulations stipulate a rule does not enjoy academic freedom, because the faculty members must act according to what is dictated in the regulations; 2. The university auditor will refrain from initiating an audit in the areas that appear in paragraph 15, mentioned above, of the Higher Education Council Law. The author of the article further maintains that the fact that the paragraph indicating the authority of the university auditor by virtue of the "Internal Audit Law 1992" in the Higher Education Council Law appears as a sub-paragraph in section 15, which grants universities and their faculty members academic freedom, adds validity to his approach. To say: academic freedom on the one hand, but not unlimited, and subject to audit on the other hand, and it all involves one short paragraph of the law.

Academic freedom for colleges and universities (institutional autonomy) 
A prominent feature of the English university concept is the freedom to appoint faculty, set standards and admit students. This ideal may be better described as institutional autonomy and is distinct from whatever freedom is granted to students and faculty by the institution.

The Supreme Court of the United States said that academic freedom means a university can "determine for itself on academic grounds:

 who may teach,
 what may be taught,
 how it should be taught, and
 who may be admitted to study."

In a 2008 case, a federal court in Virginia ruled that professors have no academic freedom; all academic freedom resides with the university or college. In that case, Stronach v. Virginia State University, a district court judge held "that no constitutional right to academic freedom exists that would prohibit senior (university) officials from changing a grade given by (a professor) to one of his students." The court relied on mandatory precedent of the U.S. Supreme Court case of Sweezy v. New Hampshire and a case from the fourth circuit court of appeals. The Stronach court also relied on persuasive cases from several circuits of the courts of appeals, including the first, third, and seventh circuits. That court distinguished the situation when a university attempts to coerce a professor into changing a grade, which is clearly in violation of the First Amendment, from when university officials may, in their discretionary authority, change the grade upon appeal by a student. The Stronach case has gotten significant attention in the academic community as an important precedent.

Relationship to freedom of speech 
Academic freedom and free speech rights are not coextensive, although this widely accepted view has been recently challenged by an "institutionalist" perspective on the First Amendment. Academic freedom involves more than speech rights; for example, it includes the right to determine what is taught in the classroom. The AAUP gives teachers a set of guidelines to follow when their ideas are considered threatening to religious, political, or social agendas. When teachers speak or write in public, whether via social media or in academic journals, they are able to articulate their own opinions without the fear from institutional restriction or punishment, but they are encouraged to show restraint and clearly specify that they are not speaking for their institution. In practice, academic freedom is protected by institutional rules and regulations, letters of appointment, faculty handbooks, collective bargaining agreements, and academic custom.

In the U.S., the freedom of speech is guaranteed by the First Amendment, which states that "Congress shall make no law... abridging the freedom of speech, or of the press...." By extension, the First Amendment applies to all governmental institutions, including public universities. The U.S. Supreme Court has consistently held that academic freedom is a First Amendment right at public institutions. However, the United States' First Amendment has generally been held to not apply to private institutions, including religious institutions. These private institutions may honor freedom of speech and academic freedom at their discretion.

Controversies

Evolution debate 
 
Academic freedom is also associated with a movement to introduce intelligent design as an alternative explanation to evolution in US public schools. Supporters claim that academic institutions need to fairly represent all possible explanations for the observed biodiversity on Earth, rather than implying no alternatives to evolutionary theory exist.

Critics of the movement claim intelligent design is religiously motivated pseudoscience and cannot be allowed into the curriculum of US public schools due to the First Amendment to the United States Constitution, often citing Kitzmiller v. Dover Area School District as legal precedent. They also reject the allegations of discrimination against proponents of intelligent design, of which investigation showed no evidence.

A number of "academic freedom bills" have been introduced in state legislatures in the United States between 2004 and 2008. The bills were based largely upon language drafted by the Discovery Institute, the hub of the Intelligent Design movement, and derive from language originally drafted for the Santorum Amendment in the United States Senate. According to The Wall Street Journal, the common goal of these bills is to expose more students to articles and videos that undercut evolution, most of which are produced by advocates of intelligent design or biblical creationism. The American Association of University Professors has reaffirmed its opposition to these bills, including any portrayal of creationism as a scientifically credible alternative and any misrepresentation of evolution as scientifically controversial. , only the Louisiana bill has been successfully passed into law.

Communism 
In the 20th century and particularly the 1950s during McCarthyism, there was much public date in print on Communism's role in academic freedom, e.g., Sidney Hook's Heresy, Yes–Conspiracy, No and Whittaker Chambers' "Is Academic Freedom in Danger?" among many other books and articles.

Diversity Initiatives 

Since 2014, Harvard Medical School Dean Jeffrey Flier, and American Mathematical Society Vice President Abigail Thompson have contended that academics are asked to support diversity initiatives, and are discouraged from voicing opposition to equity and inclusion through self-censorship, as well as explicit promotion, hiring, and firing.

Pontifical universities
Pontifical universities around the world such as The Catholic University of America, the Pontifical University of Saint Thomas Aquinas, Angelicum in Rome, the Université catholique de Louvain in Belgium, and the Pontifical Catholic University of Peru depend for their status as pontifical universities and for the terms of academic freedom on the Pope through the Congregation for Catholic Education. The terms of academic freedom at ecclesiastical institutions of education are outlined in the apostolic constitution Sapientia Christiana.

Specific cases
While some controversies of academic freedom are reflected in proposed laws that would affect large numbers of students through entire regions, many cases involve individual academics that express unpopular opinions or share politically unfavorable information. These individual cases may receive widespread attention and periodically test the limits of, and support for, academic freedom. Several of these specific cases are also the foundations for later legislation.

The Lane Rebels 
In the early 1830s, students at the Lane Theological Seminary, in Cincinnati, sponsored a series of debates lasting 18 days. The topic was the American Colonization Society's project of sending free blacks to (not "back to") Africa, specifically Liberia, and opposing freeing slaves unless they agreed to leave the United States immediately. The Society, whose founders and officers were Southern slaveowners, provided funding for existing free blacks to relocate to Liberia, believing that free blacks caused unrest among the slaves, and that the United States was and should remain a white country. (Blacks were not citizens until the ratification of the 14th Amendment in 1868.) The winner of the debate was the rejection of the Society's plan, which at best only helped a few thousand, in favor of abolitionism: the immediate, complete, and uncompensated freeing of all slaves.

The trustees of the Seminary, fearing a repeat of the anti-abolitionist Cincinnati riots of 1829, prohibited any further "off-topic" discussions", overruling the faculty in the process. As a result, the vast majority of the student body left Lane (the "Lane Rebels") to become the initial class of the new Oberlin Collegiate Institute. They first obtained a written guarantee from the Oberlin trustees that there would be no limits on discourse, and that the faculty, not the trustees, would control the internal affairs of the school.

The Bassett Affair at Duke University 
The Bassett Affair at Duke University in North Carolina in the early 20th century was an important event in the history of academic freedom. In October 1903, Professor John Spencer Bassett publicly praised Booker T. Washington and drew attention to the racism and white supremacist behavior of the Democratic party. Many media reports castigated Bassett, and several major newspapers published opinion pieces attacking him and demanding his termination. On December 1, 1903, the entire faculty of the college threatened to resign en masse if the board gave in to political pressures and asked Bassett to resign. He resigned after "parents were urged to withdraw their children from the college and churchmen were encouraged not to recommend the college to perspective students." President Teddy Roosevelt later praised Bassett for his willingness to express the truth as he saw it.

Professor Mayer and DeGraff of The University of Missouri 
In 1929, experimental psychology professor Max Friedrich Meyer and sociology assistant professor Harmon O. DeGraff were dismissed from their positions at the University of Missouri for advising student Orval Hobart Mowrer regarding distribution of a questionnaire which inquired about attitudes towards partners' sexual tendencies, modern views of marriage, divorce, extramarital sexual relations, and cohabitation. The university was subsequently censured by the American Association of University Professors in an early case regarding academic freedom due a tenured professor.

Professor Rice of Rollins College 
In a famous case investigated by the American Association of University Professors, President Hamilton Holt of Rollins College in March 1933 fired John Andrew Rice, an atheist scholar and unorthodox teacher, whom Holt had hired, along with three other "golden personalities", in his push to put Rollins on the cutting edge of innovative education. Holt then required all professors to make a "loyalty pledge" to keep their jobs. The American Association of University Professors censured Rollins. Rice and the three other "golden personalities", who were all dismissed for refusing to make the loyalty pledge, founded Black Mountain College.

William Shockley 
In 1978, a Nobel prize-winning physicist, electronics inventor, and electrical engineering professor, William Shockley, was concerned about relatively high reproductive rates among people of African descent, because he believed that genetics doomed black people to be intellectually inferior to white people. He stated that he believed his work on race to be more important than his work leading to the Nobel prize. He was strongly criticized for this stance, which raised some concerns about whether criticism of unpopular views of racial differences suppressed academic freedom.

President Summers of Harvard 
In 2006, Lawrence Summers, while president of Harvard University, led a discussion that was intended to identify the reasons why fewer women chose to study science and mathematics at advanced levels. He suggested that the possibility of intrinsic gender differences in terms of talent for science and mathematics should be explored. He became the target of considerable public backlash. His critics were, in turn, accused of attempting to suppress academic freedom. Due to the adverse reception to his comments, he resigned after a five-year tenure. Another significant factor of his resignation was several votes of no-confidence placed by the deans of schools, notably multiple professors in the Faculty of Arts and Sciences.

Duke Lacrosse Scandal 
The 2006 scandal in which several members of the Duke Lacrosse team were falsely accused of rape raised serious criticisms against exploitation of academic freedom by the university and its faculty to press judgement and deny due process to the three players accused.

Professor Khan of the University of KwaZulu-Natal 
In 2006 trade union leader and sociologist Fazel Khan was fired from the University of KwaZulu-Natal in Durban, South Africa after taking a leadership role in a strike. In 2008 international concern was also expressed at attempts to discipline two other academics at the same university – Nithiya Chetty and John van der Berg – for expressing concern about academic freedom at the university.

Author J Michael Bailey of Northwestern University 
J. Michael Bailey wrote a popular science-style book, The Man Who Would Be Queen, the idea that trans women are motivated by sexuality. The book was heavily criticized by many academics, including Andrea James who said it exploited vulnerable people, especially children, Dr. Dreger who found that the book misrepresented those it portrayed and "did not qualify as scientific research", and Lynn Conway who found the tone of the book abusive and said that it was a recipe for further discrimination. In 2007 Dr. Conway and Dr. McCloskey filed formal complaints with Northwestern University accusing of Bailey of grossly violating scientific standards "by conducting intimate research observations on human subjects without telling them that they were objects of the study." They also filed a complaint with Illinois state regulators, requesting that they investigate Bailey for practicing psychology without a license. Other academics, have accused him of sexual misconduct.

Professor Li-Ann of New York University School of Law 
In 2009 Thio Li-ann withdrew from an appointment at New York University School of Law after controversy erupted about some anti-gay remarks she had made, prompting a discussion of academic freedom within the law school. Subsequently, Li-ann was asked to step down from her position in the NYU Law School.

Professor Robinson of the University of California at Santa Barbara 
In 2009 the University of California at Santa Barbara charged William I. Robinson with antisemitism after he circulated an email to his class containing photographs and paragraphs of the Holocaust juxtaposed to those of the Gaza Strip. Robinson was fired from the university, but after charges were dropped after a worldwide campaign against the management of the university.

The Diliman Affair of the University of the Philippines 
The University of the Philippines at Diliman affair where controversy erupted after Professor Gerardo A. Agulto of the College of Business Administration was sued by MBA graduate student Chanda R. Shahani for a nominal amount in damages for failing him several times in the Strategic Management portion of the Comprehensive Examination. Agulto refused to give a detailed basis for his grades and instead invoked Academic Freedom while Shahani argued in court that Academic Freedom could not be invoked without a rational basis in grading a student.

Professor Salaita of the University of Illinois at Urbana-Champaign 
In 2013 the University of Illinois at Urbana–Champaign offered Steven Salaita a faculty position in American Indian studies but then withdrew the offer in 2014, after reviewing some of his comments on Twitter about Israel.

Professor Guth of the University of Kansas 
Professor David Guth of the University of Kansas was persecuted by the Kansas Board of Regents due to his tweet, from a personal account linked to the university, regarding the shootings which stated, "#NavyYardShooting The blood is on the hands of the #NRA. Next time, let it be YOUR sons and daughters. Shame on you. May God damn you." Following the controversial comments, Kansas University suspended, but ultimately allowed him to come back. Because of this incident and the moral qualms it raised, the Kansas Board of Regents passed a new policy regarding social media. This new legislature allowed universities to discipline or terminate employees who used social media in ways "contrary to the best interests of the university."

See also
 Academic freedom in the Middle East
 Anthony D. Smith
 Chicago principles
 Foundation for Individual Rights and Expression
 Freedom of education
 Freedom of speech
 Hans-Hermann Hoppe – involved in an academic freedom controversy at the University of Nevada, Las Vegas
 List of educational institutions closed in the 2016 Turkish purges
 Network for Education and Academic Rights
 Politicization of science
 Pedagogy
 Right to science and culture
 Scholars at Risk
 Society for Academic Freedom and Scholarship
 Speech code
 University of Austin - proposed U.S. university announced in response to academic freedom controversies
 Urofsky v. Gilmore

References

Further reading
 Andreescu, Liviu. "Foundations of Academic Freedom: Making New Sense of Some Aging Arguments". Studies in Philosophy and Education (2009) 28.6, 499–515.
 Andreescu, Liviu. "Individual Academic Freedom and Aprofessional Acts". Educational Theory (2009) 59.5, 559–572.
Chesterman, Simon. "Academic Freedom in New Haven and Singapore". Straits Times, 30 March 2012, page A23.
 Cross, Tom. "Academic Freedom and the Hacker Ethic", Communications of the ACM, June 2006.
 Ekstrand, Lasse and Wallmon, Monika "Dancing with the Devil? Notes on a Free University". The International Journal of Diversity in Organisations, Communities and Nations (2008) 8.3, 171–174.
 
 
 Hofstadter, Richard, Academic Freedom in the Age of the College, Columbia University Press, 1955, 1961.
 Karran, Terence. "Academic Freedom in Europe: A Preliminary Comparative Analysis". Higher Education Policy (2007) 20, 289–313.
 Karran, Terence. "Academic Freedom: A Research Bibliography" (2009) has over 1000 entries and is freely downloadable as a pdf from: http://eprints.lincoln.ac.uk/1763/.
 Metzger, Walter, Academic Freedom in the Age of the University, Columbia University Press, 1955.
 .
 Nelson, Cary, No University Is an Island: Saving Academic Freedom. New York University Press, 2010. 
 Suissa, J and Sullivan, A. "The Gender Wars, Academic Freedom and Education". Journal of Philosophy of Education (2021).
 Russell, Conrad. "Academic Freedom", Routledge (1993) 
 Sandis, Constantine. "Free Speech Within Reason". Times Higher Education,21 January 2010.
 Tierney, William G., and Lanford, Michael. "The Question of Academic Freedom: Universal Right or Relative Term". Frontiers of Education in China (2014) 9.1, 4–23.

External links

 Network for Education and Academic Rights, International
 Academic Freedom Watch, Australia
 American Association of University Professors
 Academic Freedom Week
 Council for Academic Freedom and Academic Standards, United Kingdom 
Scholars at Risk
 Society for Academic Freedom and Scholarship, Canada

Archives
Washington Committee for Academic Freedom records. 1947–1949. .84 cubic feet (2 boxes).
Naomi Achenbach Benson papers. 1895–1961. 19.5 cubic feet (40 boxes).
Garland O. Ethel papers. 1913–1980. 13.00 cubic ft. (13 boxes).
Ralph H. Gundlach papers. 1918–1974. 1.47 cubic feet (4 boxes).
University of Washington Office of the President records. 1854–2015. 436.48 cubic feet (498 boxes, 2 packages, 2 volumes, and 6 vertical files). Including: 1 cassette audio tape, 11 audio tape reels, 5 film reels, 1 videocassette tape.

 
Freedom
Education rights
University governance